The Italy men's national 3x3 team is a national basketball team of Italy, administered by the Federazione Italiana Pallacanestro.
It represents the country in international 3x3 (3 against 3) basketball competitions.

Italy also features a national under-18 3x3 team.

See also
Italy national basketball team
Italy women's national 3x3 team

References

Italy national basketball team
Men's national 3x3 basketball teams